David Frederick Markham MA (1800 – 31 March 1853) was a Canon of Windsor from 1827 to 1853

Career

He was educated at Westminster School and Christ Church, Oxford and graduated BA in 1821, MA in 1814.

He was appointed:
Assistant curate of Aberford 1823
Vicar of Addingham, Cumberland 1825 - 1826
Vicar of Stillingfleet, Yorkshire 1826 - 1838
Rector of Great Horkesley, Essex 1838 - 1853
Rural Dean of Dedham 1850

He was appointed to the fourth stall in St George's Chapel, Windsor Castle in 1827 and held the canonry until 1853.

He founded the Essex Antiquarian Society in 1852.

Notes

External links
 

1800 births
1853 deaths
Canons of Windsor
Alumni of Christ Church, Oxford